{{Infobox officeholder
| name=Omar Truman Burleson
| image name=Omar Burleson.jpg
| caption=Omar Burleson, 1953 from Congressional Pictorial Directory
| state=Texas
| district=17th
| party=Democratic
| term_start=January 3, 1947
| term_end=December 31, 1978
| preceded=Sam M. Russell
| succeeded=Charles Stenholm
| birth_date=
| birth_place=Anson, Texas
| death_date=
| death_place=Abilene, Texas
| spouse=
| children=
| religion=
| occupation= 
| residence= 
| alma_mater= Abilene Christian College Hardin-Simmons University Cumberland University
}}
Omar Truman Burleson (March 19, 1906 – May 14, 1991) was an attorney, judge, FBI agent and veteran of World War II when he was first elected in 1946 as a Democratic U.S. Representative from Texas's 17th congressional district. He was re-elected to Congress from this rural district for more than 30 years, resigning in December 1978 rather than run again for office.

Early life and education
Born in Anson, the seat of Jones County, north of Abilene, Texas, Burleson attended the public schools there. He received his higher education at Abilene Christian College and Hardin-Simmons University, both in Abilene.

Burleson went to Tennessee for law school, graduating in 1929 from Cumberland University in Lebanon, Tennessee. He returned to Texas, where he was admitted to the bar the same year. He set up a practice in Gorman in Eastland County. With business slowing because of the Great Depression, Burleson sought public office.

Legal and related career
In 1930 Burleson was elected to his first public office, as County Attorney of Jones County, Texas, serving from 1931 to 1934. He next was elected as a judge in Jones County, serving from 1934 to 1940.

In 1940 Burleson was hired as a special agent of the Federal Bureau of Investigation, serving into 1941. He entered politics, serving as a secretary and staff member to U.S. Representative Sam Russell of Texas's 17th congressional district in 1941 and 1942. With Russell's support, Burleson was appointed as general counsel for the Housing Authority in the District of Columbia in 1942; at that time, the District did not have home rule and was controlled by Congress through its committees.

After the United States entered World War II, Burleson served in the United States Navy from December 1942 to April 1946. He was assigned to the South Pacific Theater.

Political career
Following the war, in 1946 Burleson was elected to national office as a Democrat from the area where he had established his reputation: Texas's 17th congressional district to the Eightieth Congress. He was reelected to the fifteen succeeding Congresses from this rural district, and served from January 3, 1947, until his resignation, December 31, 1978. 

Because of his seniority, Burleson gained the chairmanships of the Committee on House Administration (Eighty-fourth through Ninetieth Congresses), the Joint Committee on the Library (Eighty-fourth through Ninetieth Congresses), and the Joint Committee on Printing (Eighty-fourth Congress).

Burleson was one of the majority of the Texan delegation to decline to sign the 1956 Southern Manifesto opposing the desegregation of public schools as ordered by the Supreme Court in its ruling on Brown v. Board of Education''. It had determined that segregated public schools were unconstitutional. Delegations of other Southern states, particularly Virginia and some in the Deep South, did sign the manifesto and actively resisted such desegregation for years.

But Burleson voted against the Civil Rights Acts of 1957, 1960, 1964, and 1968, which were directed at enforcing constitutional rights for African Americans and other minorities. He also opposed ratification of the 24th Amendment to the U.S. Constitution and passage of the Voting Rights Act of 1965, which gave the federal government oversight and enforcement over state practices that discriminated against minority voters.

Burleson chose against running for reelection in 1978. He was succeeded by the election of fellow conservative Democrat Charles Stenholm of Stamford, which is also in Jones County. Stenholm owned and operated a large cotton farm there, but lived in Abilene, Texas.

After resigning from Congress, Burleson resided in Abilene until his death there on May 14, 1991. He is interred at the Mount Hope Cemetery in Anson, his hometown.

Legacy
A statue of Burleson was installed in his hometown of Anson at the Jones County Courthouse. He had also served there in his early career as County Attorney and judge of the County Circuit Court.

References

External links

Sources

1906 births
1991 deaths
American members of the Churches of Christ
Hardin–Simmons University alumni
Abilene Christian University alumni
Samford University alumni
Cumberland School of Law alumni
Federal Bureau of Investigation agents
People from Anson, Texas
Democratic Party members of the United States House of Representatives from Texas
20th-century American politicians